Valse Triste may refer to: 

 Valse triste (Sibelius), a 1904 orchestral piece by Jean Sibelius
 Valse triste (Liberda), a 1977 ballet by Bruno Liberda 
 Valse Triste (ballet), a 1985 ballet by Peter Martins
 Valse Triste, a 1977 experimental collage film by Bruce Conner